The long-footed shrew (Crocidura crenata) is a species of mammal in the family Soricidae. It is found in Cameroon, Central African Republic, Republic of the Congo, Democratic Republic of the Congo, Equatorial Guinea, and Gabon. Its natural habitat is subtropical or tropical moist lowland forests.

References
 Hutterer, R. 2004.  Crocidura crenata.   2006 IUCN Red List of Threatened Species.   Downloaded on 30 July 2007.

Crocidura
Mammals described in 1965
Taxonomy articles created by Polbot
Taxa named by Henri Heim de Balsac